The Mounted Stranger is a 1930 American Western film that was a remake of The Ridin' Kid from Powder River (1924), which was an adaptation of Henry Herbert Knibbs's novel of the same name.

Synopsis 
Pete Ainslee (played by Hoot Gibson) locates Steve Gary, who killed Ainslee's father when Ainslee was a child and a witness to the murder. The adult Ainslee wounds Gary in a gunfight, but he becomes the hunted one after Gary recovers.

Cast 
Hoot Gibson as Pete Ainslee aka The Ridin' Kid
Buddy Hunter as Pete as a boy
Milton Brown as 'Pop' Ainslee
Fred Burns as Steve Gary
Jim Corey as 'White-Eye' 
Francis Ford as 'Spider' Coy
Walter Patterson as Spider's lookout
Francelia Billington as Mrs. Coy
Louise Lorraine as Bonita Coy

Production 
The Mounted Stranger was written and directed by Arthur Rosson. It was released on February 8, 1930, by Universal Pictures. Harry Neumann was the cinematographer, and Gibson was the producer. Henry H. Knibbs was the author, and Gilmore Walker was the editor. The film's sets were designed by art director David S. Garber.

References

External links 
 

1930 films
1930s English-language films
American Western (genre) films
1930 Western (genre) films
Universal Pictures films
Films directed by Arthur Rosson
American black-and-white films
1930s American films